Berend Weijs (born 15 December 1988) is a Dutch basketball player who last played for Apollo Amsterdam. Since then, he has been active as a professional player in the Netherlands.

Professional career
After his collegiate time, he spent two seasons in the Dutch Basketball League with Apollo Amsterdam. Following, he played three seasons in the Dutch second division for the Landslake Lions. For the 2017–18 season, Weijs returned to Apollo Amsterdam. He averaged 11.0 points and 6.2 rebounds per game on the season and re-signed with the club on July 19, 2018. The 2019–20 season was ended early in March because of the COVID-19 pandemic. The same month, Weijs announced his retirement. He returned to Apollo in January 2021. Weijs left Apollo after the 2021–22 season.

References

External links
DBL Profile (in Dutch)

1988 births
Living people
Apollo Amsterdam players
Basketball players from Amsterdam
Centers (basketball)
Dutch Basketball League players
Dutch expatriate basketball people in the United States
Dutch men's basketball players
Harcum College alumni
Junior college men's basketball players in the United States
Maryland Terrapins men's basketball players
Power forwards (basketball)
Sportspeople from Zaanstad